The Roman Catholic Archdiocese of Nanning is an archdiocese located in the city of Nanning (Guangxi) in China.

History

 August 6, 1875: Established as Apostolic Prefecture of Guangxi 廣西 from the Apostolic Vicariate of Guangdong 廣東
 June 6, 1914: Promoted as Apostolic Vicariate of Guangxi 廣西
 December 3, 1924: Renamed as Apostolic Vicariate of Nanning 南寧
 April 11, 1946: Promoted as Metropolitan Archdiocese of Nanning 南寧

Leadership
 Archbishops of Nanning (Roman rite)
 Archbishop Joseph Tan Yanquan (2007–present)
 Archbishop Joseph Meng Ziwen (1984 - 2007)
 Archbishop Paulin-Joseph-Justin Albouy, M.E.P. (沈士杰) (April 11, 1946 – February 7, 1954)
 Vicars Apostolic of Nanning 南寧 (Roman Rite)
 Bishop Paulin-Joseph-Justin Albouy, M.E.P. (沈士杰) (later Archbishop) (June 30, 1930 – April 11, 1946)
 Bishop Maurice-François Ducoeur, M.E.P. (刘志忠) (April 6, 1914 – June 10, 1929)
 Prefects Apostolic of Guangxi (Kuamsi) 廣西 (Roman Rite)
 Bishop Maurice-François Ducoeur, M.E.P. (刘志忠) (December 22, 1910 – April 6, 1914)
 Bishop Joseph-Marie Lavest, M.E.P. (罗惠良) (April 26, 1900 – August 23, 1910)
 Bishop Jean-Benoît Chouzy, M.E.P. (司立修) (August 21, 1891 – September 22, 1899)
 Bishop Pierre-Noël-Joseph Foucard, M.E.P. (富于道) (August 13, 1878 – March 31, 1889)
 Fr. Aloysius Jolly, M.E.P. (文芍理) (1875–1878)

Suffragan dioceses
 Wuzhou 梧州

References

Sources
 GCatholic.org
 Catholic Hierarchy

Roman Catholic dioceses in China
Religious organizations established in 1875
Roman Catholic dioceses and prelatures established in the 19th century
Religion in Guangxi
Nanning